{{DISPLAYTITLE:Gamma2 Octantis}}

γ2 Octantis, Latinized to Gamma2 Octantis (Gamma2 Oct), is a solitary star in the southern circumpolar constellation Octans. It has an apparent magnitude of 5.72, allowing it to be faintly seen with the naked eye.

Gamma2 Oct has a stellar classification of K0 III, indicating that it is a red giant. At present it has 115% the mass of the Sun but has expanded to 10.54 times its girth.

References

Octans
Octantis, Gamma2
Octantis,87
224362
118114
9061
PD-82 907
K-type giants